Alma de bohemio (English language: The Bohemian Soul) is a 1949  Argentine film directed by Julio Saraceni and written by Carlos A. Petit with Rodolfo Sciammarella.  It stars Alberto Castillo and Fidel Pintos.

Cast

 Alberto Castillo   
 Fidel Pintos   
  Lilian Valmar   
 Lalo Malcolm   
 Rodolfo Díaz Soler   
 Anita Beltrán   
 Arturo Palito   
 Betty Lagos   
 Diana Maggi   
 Cirilo Etulain   
 Vicente Forastieri   
 Nora Gilbert   
 Luis García Bosch   
 Pablo Cumo   
 Margarita Burke   
 Vicente Rubino
 Rafael Diserio

References

External links

1949 films
1940s Spanish-language films
Argentine black-and-white films
Films directed by Julio Saraceni
1940s Argentine films